Qaratlu may refer to:
 Qaratlu, East Azerbaijan
 Qaratlu, Hamadan